This was the first edition of the tournament.

Myneni and Singh won the title, defeating Divij Sharan and Vishnu Vardhan in the final, 6–3, 3–6, [10–4].

Seeds

  Sanchai Ratiwatana /  Sonchat Ratiwatana (first round)
  Yuki Bhambri /  Michael Venus (first round)
  Somdev Devvarman /  Purav Raja (first round)
  Ruben Gonzales /  Artem Sitak (second round)

Draw

Draw

References

External links
 Main Draw

State Bank of India ATP Challenger Tour - Doubles